Jackie Cahill (born 5 August 1963) is an Irish Fianna Fáil politician who has been a Teachta Dála (TD) for the Tipperary constituency since the 2016 general election.

Cahill is from Thurles. In a 2020 interview with the Irish Independent, he stated that he lost an eye and claimed to have been reluctant in his initial involvement in farm politics.  

Cahill had been a member of Tipperary County Council from 2014 to 2016, when he was elected to Dáil Éireann. He is the former president of the Irish Creamery Milk Suppliers Association (ICMSA). He is also a former member of Bord Bia, the National Dairy Board, the National Dairy Council (of which he was Chair) and the European Milk Board. He was also a board member of Thurles Greyhound Track and Centenary Thurles Co-operative Society. Cahill was Chair of the Thurles Co-operative at the time of its merger with Centenary Co-operative. 

Cahill became Chair of the Oireachtas Agriculture Committee in the 33rd Dáil. In August 2020, Cahill expressed disappointment with not being appointed as Minister for Agriculture, stating that “I think I had a serious CV in agriculture.”

In his 2020 book, In Bed with the Blueshirts, former government minister Shane Ross criticised Cahill for working with fellow Tipperary Deputies Alan Kelly, Mattie McGrath and Michael Lowry to lobby on behalf of vintners to defeat his bill to tighten drink driving limits.

In 2021, he called for Glanbia to be granted planning permission for a cheese factory in Kilkenny, owning shares in the company at the time, according to the Oireachtas Register of Interests. In August 2021, the Irish Examiner included Cahill on a list of Fianna Fáil TDs who may rebel against party leader and Taoiseach, Micheál Martin. In 2022, he opposed reductions in the national livestock herd to meet emissions targets, saying that herd reduction was "not an option".

References

External links
Jackie Cahill's page on the Fianna Fáil website

Living people
Members of the 32nd Dáil
Members of the 33rd Dáil
Fianna Fáil TDs
Local councillors in County Tipperary
1963 births